The Thurmond and Lucy Chatham House is a historic home located at Winston-Salem, Forsyth County, North Carolina. It was built in 1925, and is a Classical Revival style stuccoed dwelling consisting of a -story main block flanked by two-bay-wide projecting hip-roofed sections. It has a tall hip roof and bluestone terrace that fills the rear courtyard of the "H"-shaped plan. The house encompasses 9,065-square-feet of living space. Also on the property is a contributing -story garage / apartment. It was built for Congressman and businessman Richard Thurmond Chatham (1896–1957), who also served as president of the Chatham Manufacturing Company and his wife, Lucy Hodgin Hanes.

It was listed on the National Register of Historic Places in 2014.

References

Houses on the National Register of Historic Places in North Carolina
Neoclassical architecture in North Carolina
Houses completed in 1925
Houses in Winston-Salem, North Carolina
National Register of Historic Places in Winston-Salem, North Carolina
Hanes family
1925 establishments in North Carolina